Union Sportive Gorée is a Senegalese football club based in Dakar. They play in the top division in Senegalese football. Their home stadium is Stade Demba Diop.

Achievements
Senegal Premier League: 3
1978, 1981, 1984.

Senegal FA Cup: 4
1965, 1972, 1992, 1996.

Coupe de la Ligue: 0

Senegal Assemblée Nationale Cup: 0

French West African Cup: 3
1947, 1954, 1955.

Performance in CAF competitions
African Cup of Champions Clubs: 4 appearances
1966: First Round
1979: Semi-Finals
1982: withdrew in First Round
1985: Semi-Finals

CAF Confederation Cup: 1 appearance
2007 - First Round

CAF Cup Winners' Cup: 3 appearances
1976 - First Round
1993 - Second Round
1997 - First Round

Football clubs in Senegal
Sport in Dakar
1974 establishments in Senegal